I Spit on Your Rave was the title for a planned 2010 film production by Film4 and Warp Films, who in 2009 released a trailer to promote their mockumentary zombie comedy horror film starring Noel Fielding. It was written and directed by Chris Boyle, and recorded during the 2009 Big Chill Music Festival, at an event recorded by Guinness Book of World Records for breaking the record for "Most Amount of Zombies Captured on Camera".

Production

Filmed in Herefordshire at Eastnor Castle Deer Park,  I Spit on Your Rave was filmed partly in an attempt to break the world record for "Most Amount of Zombies Captured on Camera". People attending the Big Chill Festival on 6 August 2009,  were encouraged to come dressed as zombies as part of the attempt.  For those who wished to take part but did not arrive in costume, make-up "Zombification Stations" were set up at arena entrances.  Though many more were alleged to have taken part, the record was officially broken when 4,026 people were counted as zombies for the film.

Post-production
Though announced for a 2010 premiere, a completed feature film was never released, but on 30 October 2012 it was reported that the I Spit on Your Rave film was being re-developed as a six-part TV series for the E4 television channel.

Plot
During the 2012 Summer Olympics in London, a virus was released which causes a zombie uprising which decimates humanity. In the year 2018, six years after civilization is destroyed and with few humans left, the King of the Zombies (Noel Fielding) organizes a music festival to keep the zombie horde entertained after the zombie apocalypse.

Reception
Quiet Earth wrote: "Of all the creative ways to exploit the zombie genre, I Spit on Your Rave has got be up there with the best of them", offering that the film would not appeal to everyone and may well annoy many.

See also
I Spit on Your Grave
Shaun of the Dead
Return of the Living Dead: Rave to the Grave
Zombieland
List of zombie short films and undead-related projects

References

External links
 
 Official trailer at Vimeo

2009 films
2009 comedy horror films
2009 short films
2000s English-language films
2000s science fiction comedy films
2000s science fiction horror films
British post-apocalyptic films
British science fiction comedy films
British science fiction horror films
British zombie comedy films
Films set in 2012
Films set in 2018
Films set in London
Unreleased films
2000s British films